The Beas River  (Hyphasis in Ancient Greek) is a river in north India.

As of 2017, the river is home to a tiny isolated population of the Indus dolphin.

Etymology
Veda Vyasa, the author of the Indian epic Mahabharata, is the eponym of the river Beas; he is said to have created it from its source lake, the Beas Kund.

Before Veda Vyasa, the Vipasa river was known as Saraswati. Rishi Vashishta, the great grandfather of Vyasa tried to jump into this river from an overlooking hillock, to sacrifice his soul. He tied himself with several cords to drown himself. However, the river altered form to become a sandbed, saving him. And in this course, the cords got broken, so Vashishta named the river Vipasa, which means cord-breaker.  On account of this incident, the great Rishi opted to settle near the river, and made it a residence for some years. Thereby, it became known as Vashisht (after Vashishta). We can find Vashishta Brahmarishi Temple in this village.

Rig-veda calls the river Vipāś, which means unfettered,
in later Sanskrit texts it's been called Vipāśā, Yāska identifies it with Argrikiya.

Ancient Greeks called it Hyphasis, Plinius called it Hypasis, an approximation to the vedic Vipāś. Other classical names are Hynais, Bipasis, Bibasis.

In modern times, the river has also been called Bias or Bejah.

History

The Beas River marks the easternmost border of Alexander the Great's conquests in 326 BCE. It was one of the rivers which created problems in Alexander's invasion of India. His troops mutinied here in 326 BCE, refusing to go any further. Alexander shut himself in his tent for three days, but when his men did not change their desires he gave in, raising twelve colossal altars to mark the limit and glory of his expedition.

According to the Kavyamimansa of Rajasekhara, the kingdom-territories of the Gurjara-Pratihara monarch Mahipala I extended as far as the upper course of the river Beas in the north-west.

In the 20th century, the river was developed under the Beas Project for irrigation and hydroelectric power generation purposes. The Pong Dam served initially to primarily provide irrigation below Talwara but was soon developed as well for power generation; its power station has a 360 MW installed capacity. The Pandoh Dam diverts the river through a system of tunnels and channels to the 990 MW Dehar Power Station on the Sutlej River, connecting both rivers.

The Shahnehar canal takes off from the Shahnehar barrage/headwork which is located just downstream of Pong dam to supply water for irrigation needs and four cascading power houses at the canal drops before releasing water further downstream in the Beas river. These power stations, named Mukerian hydel (12 units), has 207 MW total generating capacity. 

At the confluence with the Sutlej river, Harike barrage was constructed to divert the combined water flows of both rivers to irrigation canals to serve Rajasthan and Punjab areas.

Course
During its lower course the Beas is crossed by numerous ferries, many of which consist of inflated skins (darais). On meeting the Sivalik Hills in Hoshiarpur, the river sweeps sharply northward, forming the boundary with Kangra District. Then bending round the base of the Sivalik Hills, it takes the southerly direction, separating the districts of Gurdaspur and Hoshiapur. After touching the Jalandhar district for a short distance, the river forms the boundary between Amritsar and Kapurthala. The chief tributaries are Bain, Banganga, Luni and Uhal.
The Sutlej continues into Pakistani Punjab and joins the Chenab River at Uch near Bahawalpur to form the Panjnad River; the latter in turn joins the Indus River at Mithankot.

The water of the Beas river is allocated to India under the terms of the Indus Waters Treaty between India and Pakistan. The mean annual flow is 14.203 million acre feet (MAF).

Tragedy

On 8 June 2014, 24 engineering students and one tour operator drowned when the flood gates of the Larji dam were opened.

Pollution 
On May 17, 2018, countless number of fishes and other aquatic animals were found dead in Beas river due to release of molasses from a sugar mill situated on its shore at Kiri Afgana village in Gurdaspur district. Locals have noted that the river color has changed to rust brown and dead fishes were floating in the river. Punjab Pollution Control Board have ordered the closure of the factory and an enquiry has been initiated. Besides sealing, the sugar mill has been charged a fine of Rs. 25 lakh for this negligence.

References

Rigvedic rivers
Rivers of Punjab, India
Tributaries of the Indus River
Rivers of Himachal Pradesh
Indus basin
Rivers of India
Rivers in Buddhism